M100 or M-100 may refer to:

 M-100 (Michigan highway), a north–south state trunkline highway in the U.S. state of Michigan
 M100 (Cape Town), a metropolitan route near Cape Town, South Africa 
 M-100 (rocket), a two-stage Soviet sounding rocket
 M-100 (explosive), a pyrotechnic device
 M100, the magnetoencephalographic equivalent to the N100 large, negative-going evoked potential measured by electroencephalography
 Messier 100, a grand design spiral galaxy
 Miles Student (M.100), a lightweight trainer aircraft
 Palm m100 series, a popular lower cost version of the Palm Pilot
 M100 (New York City bus), a New York City Bus route in Manhattan
 Effa M100, the Brazilian name for the Changhe Ideal automobile
 M100, the second version of the Jeep trailer
 M100 Elan, a model of the Lotus Elan automobile
 Mercedes-Benz M100 engine, a 6.3/6.9 liter SOHC V8 automobile engine
 TRS-80 Model 100, an early portable computer
 Canon EOS M100, an mirrorless camera from Canon
 Mitsubishi SpaceJet M100, a regional jet aircraft
 HKL Class M100, a metro train of Helsinki Metro
M100 (Cape Town), a Metropolitan Route in Cape Town, South Africa

In athletics:
 Masters athletics, an age group for athletes aged 35+